Andy Lorei (born March 25, 1989) is an American soccer player who most recently played for the Ontario Fury in the Major Arena Soccer League.

Career

Early years
Andrew Lorei developed as a young athlete while playing for the Erie Admirals Soccer Club. He was a member of the boys under-17 squad which won the PPA West Cup and National Indoor Championship in 2005.

College
Lorei attended Cathedral Preparatory School in 2007, and spent one season playing college soccer at NCAA Division II Gannon University.

Professional
Lorei left school early to sign with the Rochester Rhinos of the USL First Division in August 2008, but only played two games before tearing his anterior cruciate ligament at the end of September and missing the rest of his debut pro season. He was released by the Rhinos at the end of the year.

He made a return to the pitch in 2010 after signing with USL Second Division side Real Maryland Monarchs, but spent the majority of the season on loan with the Michigan Bucks in the USL Premier Development League.

Lorei signed with NSC Minnesota Stars of the North American Soccer League on March 22, 2011.

Lorei joined Bodens BK for their 2014 season.

On July 14, 2017, it was announced that Lorei had signed with the San Diego Sockers of the Major Arena Soccer League.

References

External links
 Rochester Rhinos bio

1989 births
Living people
American soccer players
Rochester New York FC players
Real Maryland F.C. players
Flint City Bucks players
Minnesota United FC (2010–2016) players
Bodens BK players
FC Tulsa players
Association football midfielders
USL First Division players
USL Second Division players
USL League Two players
North American Soccer League players
USL Championship players
Soccer players from Pennsylvania
Major Arena Soccer League players
San Diego Sockers (PASL) players
Ontario Fury players